These are the Olympic medalists in women's handball.

References
General

Specific

Handball
medalists

Handball
Olympic